Li Fei (February 17, 1983) is a Chinese football player who currently plays as a left-footed midfielder.

Club career
Li Fei was scouted as a 17 years old to join Shenzhen's youth team before he graduated to their senior team in the 2002 league season. While he was part of the squad that won the 2004 league title it wasn't until the 2005 league season when the new head coach Chi Shangbin showed faith within Li and started to establish him as a vital member within the team. Unfortunately Li's establishment within the team's midfield came at a time during a transitional period in the club's history when the team sold most of their top players to relieve their financial problems, however Li remained and was one of the few constants within the team. A faithful member of the team Li's loyalties have been tested, first in 2007 when he attracted interest from one of his hometown clubs Wuhan Guanggu and then again in 2009 when he demanded better pay for not only himself but for several other players as well 
. In response Shenzhen reached a consensus with Li and also made him the team's captain.

Club career stats
Statistics accurate as of match played 28 October 2017.

Honours
Shenzhen
Chinese Super League: 2004

References

External links
Player stats at sohu.com

1983 births
Living people
Footballers from Wuhan
Chinese footballers
Shenzhen F.C. players
Chinese Super League players
China League One players
Association football midfielders